Anomogenes is a genus of moths in the family Geometridae.

Species
 Anomogenes morphnopa Turner, 1932

References
 Anomogenes at Markku Savela's Lepidoptera and Some Other Life Forms

Geometrinae
Geometridae genera